Same-sex marriage in Belgium has been legal since 1 June 2003. A bill for the legalization of same-sex marriages was passed by the Senate on 28 November 2002, and by the Chamber of Representatives on 30 January 2003. It entered into force on 1 June, after King Albert II gave his royal assent. Belgium became the second country in the world to legalise same-sex marriage, after the Netherlands. "Statutory cohabitation", open to any two legally consenting cohabiting persons, has been available since 1 January 2000.

Statutory cohabitation
In 1995, a bill was introduced in the Federal Parliament to provide for a legal framework of "cohabitation agreements". It was mostly intended as a response to the lowering marriage rates rather than giving rights to same-sex couples. In 1998, the bill was changed to "statutory cohabitation", and finally voted on. The Chamber of Representatives approved it by a 98–10 vote with 32 abstentions and the Senate by a 39–8 vote with 19 abstentions. The Act establishing statutory cohabitation, also known as the Act of 23 November 1998, gives limited rights to registered same-sex and opposite-sex couples by amending certain provisions of the Belgian Civil Code and the Belgian Judicial Code. However, being a couple is not a requirement to make a declaration of statutory cohabitation; relatives can do so too. The law was legally published on 12 January 1999 but would not go into effect until 1 January 2000 (see below).

Statistics
From 2000 to 2014, 698,395 people reported being in a statutory cohabitation. In 2014, same-sex couples accounted for 3.2% of all unions. Since 2010, the number of newly-established statutory cohabitations has remained relatively constant at around 40,000 new unions per year, almost the same as the number of new marriages per year. In 2019, 40,801 new unions were established (compared to 44,270 marriages) and 26,301 unions were dissolved (compared to 22,435 divorces).

Same-sex marriage

History
Same-sex marriage has been legal in Belgium since 1 June 2003, making it the second country in the world to open marriage to same-sex couples, after the Netherlands, and 9 days ahead of the Canadian province of Ontario. Legislation to grant marriage rights to same-sex couples was passed by both chambers of the Federal Parliament in November 2002 and January 2003 with the support of most political parties, and received royal assent on 13 February 2003. In Belgian public discourse, same-sex marriage is commonly known as "marriage for all" or as "homomarriage".

In the late 1990s, gay rights organisations in Belgium lobbied for the legalization of same-sex marriage. Belgian civil law did not explicitly require that two people be of opposite gender to be able to marry, as this was considered self-evident. Private member's bills in the 1990s by Flemish Block senators to add this as an explicit requirement were never considered.

Verhofstadt Government
The election programmes of the SP (Flemish Social Democrats), Agalev (Flemish Greens) and VLD (Flemish Liberals) for the 13 June 1999 elections included the aim of legalising same-sex marriage. The Verhofstadt I Government formed after the elections was made up of a coalition of liberal, socialist and green parties and excluded the long-dominant Christian Democrats, who lost the elections due to the Dioxin Affair. The coalition agreement included "implementing a full legal partnership scheme" as well as "immediately making the Act of 23 November 1998 enter into force", which had not been done yet. A royal order signed on 14 December and published on 23 December 1999 made the law on statutory cohabitation go into effect on 1 January 2000.

In 1999, the PS (French-speaking Social Democrats) and Ecolo (French-speaking Greens) also announced their support for the legalisation of same-sex marriage. At that point, the only remaining party in government that opposed same-sex marriage was the French-speaking liberal PRL (later merged into MR), mainly because it was opposed to adoption rights for same-sex couples. PRL agreed not to block same-sex marriage if adoption rights were excluded. As the first same-sex marriage in the Netherlands was performed on 1 April 2001, the Belgian Government, mostly under the lead of Minister of Health Magda Aelvoet (Agalev), began considering it as well. On 22 June, the Council of Ministers formally approved opening marriage to same-sex couples. In September, the largest opposition party, the Christian People's Party (CVP), held a party convention where they rebranded into Christian Democratic & Flemish (CD&V), with a renewed party platform, including the aim of legalising same-sex marriage, put forward by their youth wing.

On 30 November 2001, however, the Council of State gave a negative legal opinion on the bill, saying that "marriage is defined as the union of a man and a woman". LGBT organisations and government ministers criticised the opinion and said they would proceed with the legislation. The Council of Ministers formally approved the government bill on 8 December 2001 and in second reading on 30 January 2002, and submitted it to the Chamber of Representatives on 14 March 2002, where it faced a Justice Committee overloaded with bills to consider. In May 2002, the government bill was withdrawn from the Chamber and instead introduced as a private member's bill (which does not require opinions by the Council of State) in the Senate by the group leaders of the majority parties, Jeannine Leduc (VLD), Philippe Mahoux (PS), Philippe Monfils (MR), Myriam Vanlerberghe (SP.A-Spirit), Marie Nagy (Ecolo) and Frans Lozie (Agalev).

As Minister Aelvoet resigned on 28 August 2002 and elections were to be held in June 2003, the fate of the bill was unclear. Some politicians also accused Philippe Monfils of deliberately stalling the bill. Nevertheless, new momentum was gained at the start of the new parliamentary year in October 2002. The Senate Justice Committee held hearings and voted 11–4 to approve the bill. It passed in the full Senate on 28 November 2002, with 46 votes to 15 (and 4 abstentions), and on 30 January 2003 the bill passed the Chamber of Representatives by 91 votes to 22 (and 9 abstentions). The Flemish Liberals and Democrats, Christian Democratic and Flemish, the (Francophone) Socialist Party, the (Flemish) Socialist Party, Ecolo, Agalev and the People's Union voted generally in favour except for several abstentions, whereas the Flemish Block and National Front voted against, the Humanist Democratic Centre voted against with several abstentions and the Reformist Movement voted mostly against.

 * Coalition of the 1999-2003 Verhofstadt I Government.
 ** The party had recently split, but was still technically together as a parliamentary group.

King Albert II signed and promulgated the bill on 13 February 2003 and on 28 February it was published in the Belgian Official Journal and came into force on 1 June.

The first paragraph of article 143 of the Belgian Civil Code (Book I, Title V, Chapter I) now reads as follows:
 in Dutch: Een huwelijk kan worden aangegaan door twee personen van verschillend of van hetzelfde geslacht.
 in French: Deux personnes de sexe différent ou de même sexe peuvent contracter mariage.
 in German: Zwei Personen verschiedenen oder gleichen Geschlechts können eine Ehe eingehen.
 (Two persons of different sex or of the same sex may contract marriage.)

The first female couple married on 6 June 2003 and the first male couple on 13 June 2003, both in Kapellen near Antwerp.

In November 2003, opponents of same-sex marriage petitioned the Arbitration Court to invalidate the law as unconstitutional. Their main argument held that treating fundamentally different situations the same way violates the equality principle of the Constitution. In October 2004, the Arbitration Court, nowadays known as the Constitutional Court, rejected the request.

Subsequent changes
Originally, Belgium allowed the marriages of foreign same-sex couples only if their country of origin also allowed these unions. A circulaire by Minister of Justice Laurette Onkelinx (PS) of 23 January 2004, however, permits any couple to marry in Belgium if at least one of the spouses has lived in the country for a minimum of three months. This was codified into the Code of Private International Law, which took effect on 1 October 2004.

The same-sex marriage law did not permit adoption by same-sex partners, and as birth within a same-sex marriage did not imply affiliation, the same-sex spouse of the biological parent had no way to become the legal parent. A proposal to permit adoption was approved 77–62 (with 7 abstentions) by the Chamber of Representatives on 1 December 2005, and 34–33 (with 2 abstentions) by the Senate on 20 April 2006. It received royal assent on 18 May and went into force on 30 June 2006.

A legal inequality compared to heterosexual couples still existed with regards to children: the husband of the biological mother is automatically legally recognised as the father (by article 135 of the Civil Code), but this was not the case in a same-sex union for the wife of the mother. To be recognised as the co-mother, she had to complete an adoption procedure. This accounted for the large majority of adoption cases in Belgium. The Di Rupo Government promised to fix this, and in 2014, as the Netherlands had recently passed similar legislation, LGBT organisations pressured the government about their promise. Subsequently, legislators worked to agree on a solution. A bill to this end was approved by the Senate on 3 April 2014 on a 48–2 vote (with one abstention), and by the Chamber of Representatives on 23 April on a 114–10 vote (with one abstention). The bill received royal assent by King Philippe of Belgium on 5 May and went into effect on 1 January 2015. Since this change, female same-sex couples are treated equally to heterosexual couples: the co-mother married to the mother is automatically recognised as a parent, and an unmarried partner can formally recognise the child at the civil registry. An equivalent solution for male same-sex couples has not been agreed upon, due to the controversy surrounding surrogacy.

Statistics

According to the Belgian Official Journal, approximately 300 same-sex couples were married between June 2003 and April 2004 (245 in 2003 and 55 in 2004). This constituted 1.2 percent of the total number of marriages in Belgium during that period. Two-thirds of the couples were male and one-third female. On 22 July 2005, the Belgian Government announced that a total of 2,442 same-sex marriages had taken place in the country since the extension of marriage rights two years earlier. The following table summarizes the number of people who have married a partner of the same sex in Belgium per year.

The odd numbers are due to the fact that certain partners are not officially inscribed in the National Register or are the result of an incorrect registration. Figures for 2020 are lower than previous years because of the restrictions in place due to the COVID-19 pandemic.

The number of same-sex marriages by region:

Consequently, the share of same-sex marriages among all marriages also differs from region to region. In 2021, almost 2.9% of marriages in Brussels and 3.0% in Flanders were same-sex marriages, compared to 2.7% in Wallonia. The province with the lowest rate is Walloon Brabant (1.9%) and the one with the highest rate is East Flanders (3.6%).

Religious performance
The United Protestant Church in Belgium has allowed its congregations to perform same-sex marriages since 2007.

In September 2022, Roman Catholic bishops in Flanders issued a document permitting same-sex unions to be blessed in their churches. The document allows for a ritual which includes a prayer and a final benediction in front of family and friends. It emphasised that while such blessings did not alter the Catholic doctrine on "sacramental marriage," the move would allow the Church to be "pastorally close to homosexual persons" and a "welcoming [place] that excludes no one."

Public opinion
The 2006 Eurobarometer found that 62% of Belgian respondents thought same-sex marriages should be allowed in Europe.

A 2008 survey by Delta Lloyd Life found that 76% of Belgians supported same-sex marriage and 46% thought that same-sex couples could raise children just as well as opposite-sex couples.

A May 2013 Ipsos poll found that 67% of respondents were in favour of same-sex marriage and another 12% supported another form of recognition for same-sex couples. According to an Ifop poll conducted that same month, 71% of Belgians supported allowing same-sex couples to marry and adopt children.

The 2015 Eurobarometer found that 77% of Belgians thought same-sex marriage should be allowed throughout Europe, while 20% were opposed.

A Pew Research Center poll, conducted between April and August 2017 and published in May 2018, showed that 82% of Belgian people supported same-sex marriage, 10% were opposed and 8% did not know or refused to answer. When divided by religion, 88% of religiously unaffiliated people, 83% of non-practicing Christians and 66% of church-attending Christians supported same-sex marriage. Opposition was 9% among 18–34-year-olds.

The 2019 Eurobarometer found that 82% of Belgians thought same-sex marriage should be allowed throughout Europe, while 17% were opposed.

See also
2003 in LGBT rights
LGBT rights in Belgium
Recognition of same-sex unions in Europe

Notes

References

LGBT rights in Belgium
Belgium
2003 in LGBT history